Paul Roesel Garabedian (August 2, 1927May 13, 2010) was a mathematician and numerical analyst. Garabedian was the Director-Division of Computational Fluid Dynamics at the Courant Institute of Mathematical Sciences, New York University. He is known for his contributions to the fields of computational fluid dynamics and plasma physics, which ranged from elegant existence proofs for potential theory and conformal mappings to the design and optimization of stellarators. Garabedian was elected a member of the National Academy of Sciences in 1975.

Education and career
Born in  Cincinnati, Ohio, Garabedian received a bachelor's degree from Brown University in 1946 and a master's degree from the Harvard University in 1947, both in mathematics. He received his Ph.D., also from Harvard University, in 1948 under the direction of Lars Ahlfors. It was at Brown University that he met his longtime colleague and collaborator, Frances Bauer.

In 1949 Garabedian joined the faculty at the University of California as an Assistant Professor and became Associate Professor in 1952. In 1956, he moved to Stanford University as a Professor of mathematics. In 1959 he moved to the Institute of Mathematical Sciences [later renamed the Courant Institute] at New York University. In 1978 he was appointed the Director-Division of Computational Fluid Dynamics at the Courant Institute of Mathematical Sciences, New York University. In a long and fruitful academic career, Garabedian supervised 27 Ph.D. theses.  The first was in 1953 (Edward McLeod) and the last came in 1997 (Connie Chen).

Honors and awards
Sloan Fellowship, 1961–63
Guggenheim Fellowship, 1966
Fairchild Distinguished Scholar Caltech, 1975
NASA Public Service Group Achievement Award by NASA Langley Research Center, 1976
Boris Pregel Award, New York Academy of Sciences, 1980
Birkhoff Prize of the AMS and SIAM, 1983
Theodore von Kármán Prize, SIAM, 1989

Books
Partial Differential Equations, 2nd ed., Chelsea Pub. Co. (1998). 
Magnetohydrodynamic Equilibrium and Stability of Stellarators, with F. Bauer and O. Betancourt. Springer-Verlag (1984). 
Supercritical Wing Sections II, with F. Bauer, D. Korn and A. Jameson. Lecture Notes in Economics and Mathematical Systems, Springer-Verlag (1975), .

References

External links
Garabedian's Curriculum Vitae

New York Times obituary

1927 births
2010 deaths
20th-century American mathematicians
21st-century American mathematicians
American people of Armenian descent
Harvard Graduate School of Arts and Sciences alumni
Brown University alumni
Courant Institute of Mathematical Sciences faculty
Stanford University Department of Mathematics faculty
Members of the United States National Academy of Sciences
Numerical analysts
Computational fluid dynamicists
Fellows of the Society for Industrial and Applied Mathematics
Fellows of the American Academy of Arts and Sciences
Fellows of the American Physical Society
People from Cincinnati
Mathematicians from Ohio